Paul Thomas McDonald (born 20 April 1968) is a Scottish former footballer who played as a winger.

Playing career
After playing for a local boys' club in his home town McDonald was spotted by Hamilton Academical and signed for the club in June 1986. McDonald, who usually featured on the left wing played at the club during a period of comparative success, picking up winners medals for the First Division in 1987–88 and the Scottish Challenge Cup in 1992 and 1993. After a long spell at the Accies he was signed by Southampton for £75,000 in the summer of 1993. McDonald failed to make an impact at The Dell, although a successful loan spell at Burnley prompted Brighton & Hove Albion to pay £25,000 for his services in 1996. He left the club the following year and returned to Scottish football, with spells at Dunfermline Athletic, Partick Thistle and Greenock Morton before returning to Hamilton for a final two season run in 2001.

Coaching career
After this spell with the Accies, McDonald, who had also been serving the club as Youth Development Manager from 2002, retired from playing and became the SFA community coach at Kilmarnock. McDonald was placed in temporary charge of the Kilmarnock first team in October 2017, after the departure of Lee McCulloch.

Managerial statistics

References

External links

1968 births
Living people
Footballers from Motherwell
Association football defenders
Scottish footballers
Brighton & Hove Albion F.C. players
Burnley F.C. players
Dunfermline Athletic F.C. players
Greenock Morton F.C. players
Hamilton Academical F.C. players
Southampton F.C. players
Partick Thistle F.C. players
Scottish Football League players
Premier League players
English Football League players
Kilmarnock F.C. non-playing staff
Association football coaches